Sophia Nearchou (born 7 April 1992) is a Cypriot footballer who plays as a forward. She has been a member of the Cyprus women's national team.

References

1992 births
Living people
Cypriot women's footballers
Cyprus women's international footballers
Women's association football forwards
Cypriot expatriate footballers
Cypriot expatriate sportspeople in England
Expatriate women's footballers in England
Apollon Ladies F.C. players